Mesostena puncticollis, the opossum beetle, is a species of darkling beetles in the subfamily Pimeliinae.

Description
Head, thorax and elytra are black, while ventral surface is reddish brown. Pronotum is goblet-shaped, elytra are elongated-elliptical, with large spots on the spotting-rows.

Distribution and habitat
This species is present in Turkey, Saudi Arabia, Egypt, Jordan, Syria, Iraq and Iran.

References

Pimeliinae
Insects of the Middle East
Beetles described in 1835